Michael Beck (born February 4, 1949) is an American actor. He is known for his roles as Swan in The Warriors (1979) and Sonny Malone in Xanadu (1980).

Early life
Beck was born in Memphis, Tennessee, the third of nine children. He attended Memphis University School and then Millsaps College in Jackson, Mississippi on a football scholarship. While in college, he was a member of the Kappa Alpha fraternity. After graduating with a degree in economics, he was one of 30 (out of 2,500) applicants chosen for London's Central School of Speech and Drama. Beck's stage credits, beginning with college, include Camelot (he was King Arthur), Of Mice and Men (he was George Milton), Romeo and Juliet (he was Tybalt), and Cat on a Hot Tin Roof.

Career
Beck is known predominantly for his roles as Swan in the action film The Warriors (1979), Sonny Malone in Xanadu (1980), Lieutenant Commander Dallas in Megaforce (1982), and Koda in Triumphs of a Man Called Horse (1983). Both the Xanadu and Megaforce roles garnered him Razzie nominations, for Worst Actor and Worst Supporting Actor, respectively. Beck has appeared in other movies such as Warlords of the 21st Century (1982), Wes Craven's Chiller (1985), Gone to Texas (1986) as James Bowie, and Forest Warrior (1996).

Beck appeared as Hans Helms in the 1978 TV miniseries Holocaust, and starred with Michael Paré in the CBS police drama Houston Knights (1987–1988). He appeared in television shows such as JAG, Walker, Texas Ranger, In the Heat of the Night, as the Mars-born terrorist-turned-cyborg assassin Abel Horn in Babylon 5 (episode "Spider in the Web"), and as Mr. Jones in the spin-off series Crusade.

Beck has narrated numerous audiobooks of John Grisham's novels. He also narrated Confederates in the Attic by Tony Horwitz, A Darkness More Than Light by Michael Connelly, State of the Union by David Callahan, and the unabridged version of Bill Clinton's My Life. He also reprised his role as Swan in 2005, lending his voice to the popular video game adaptation of The Warriors.

Personal life
Beck is a born-again Christian.

Filmography

Film

Television

Video games

References

External links
 
 

1949 births
20th-century American male actors
21st-century American male actors
Alumni of the Royal Central School of Speech and Drama
American male film actors
American male television actors
American male voice actors
Living people
Male actors from Memphis, Tennessee